Thole is a surname. Notable people with the surname include:

 Josh Thole (born 1986), American baseball player
 Julius Thole (born 1997), German beach volleyball player
 Kik Thole (born 1944), Dutch field hockey player
 Karel Thole (1914–2000), Dutch-Italian painter and illustrator